Wilczogóra may refer to the following places:
Wilczogóra, Greater Poland Voivodeship (west-central Poland)
Wilczogóra, Grójec County in Masovian Voivodeship (east-central Poland)
Wilczogóra, Sierpc County in Masovian Voivodeship (east-central Poland)
Wilczogóra, West Pomeranian Voivodeship (north-west Poland)